Pass of the Republic, is a mountain pass in the Balkan Mountains (Stara Planina) in Bulgaria. It connects Veliko Tarnovo and Gurkovo.

It is also known as Hainboaz Pass.

The road was constructed in the 1960s.

Sources

External links
 

Mountain passes of Bulgaria
Balkan mountains
Landforms of Veliko Tarnovo Province
Landforms of Stara Zagora Province